"Sweet Seymour Skinner's Baadasssss Song" is the nineteenth episode of the fifth season of the American animated television series The Simpsons, and the 100th episode overall. It originally aired on the Fox network in the United States on April 28, 1994. In the episode, Superintendent Chalmers fires Principal Skinner after a disaster at the school. Bart, feeling partially responsible for Skinner's firing, tries to help his old principal get his job back.

The episode was written by Bill Oakley and Josh Weinstein, and directed by Bob Anderson. It was selected for release in a 1999 video collection of selected episodes called The Simpsons: Greatest Hits. The episode features cultural references to films such as Alien and Full Metal Jacket and the television series "The Wonder Years". The title is a parody of the film Sweet Sweetback's Baadasssss Song.

Since airing, the episode has received a positive critical reception from television critics. It acquired a Nielsen rating of 12.7, and was the highest-rated show on the Fox network the week it aired.

Plot
After dismissing the idea of taking Simpson family home videos and a geode, Bart brings Santa's Little Helper to school for show and tell. Bart's show-and-tell presentation is well received by the class, but the dog escapes into the air ducts and is spotted by Ralph. Principal Skinner sends Groundskeeper Willie through a vent to retrieve the dog. Willie catches the dog but becomes trapped in the ducts. As firemen attempt to rescue him, Superintendent Chalmers arrives for a surprise inspection that initially does not go well until he is charmed by Santa's Little Helper. However, Willie promptly falls from the vent and lands on him, and Chalmers fires Skinner on the spot, much to Bart's shock.

Chalmers hires Ned Flanders as the new principal of Springfield Elementary School. When Ned is hesitant to use discipline, the children run amok and the school becomes a mad house. Instead of rejoicing at the lack of discipline, Bart feels guilty for getting Skinner fired. He befriends the former principal and shares stories about Ned's failure as the school's head. Feeling lonely, Skinner decides to re-enlist in the United States Army, However, he and the Army's new recruits do not get along well and Skinner soon wants to de-enlist.

To get Skinner his job back, Bart helps Skinner get out of the Army by violating Don't Ask, Don't Tell and tries to expose Ned's poor leadership to Chalmers with Homer's help, though Skinner and Bart sadly note that it will mean their friendship cannot continue unless Bart becomes a good student, which Bart bluntly says is unlikely to happen. Despite the chaos at the school, Chalmers is unconcerned because he always disliked Skinner and thinks the school is no worse under Ned than most public schools end up being. After hearing Ned utter a brief mention of God during school announcements, however, Chalmers realizes in horror that Ned is conducting a school prayer in a public school and resolves to fire Ned and re-hire Skinner. Bart and Skinner share a friendly chat about their typically antagonistic relationship and affectionately hug each other. During their hug, Bart tapes a "Kick Me" sign on Skinner's back; Skinner tapes a "Teach Me" sign on Bart. The two chuckle to themselves as they walk away.

Production

"Sweet Seymour Skinner's Baadasssss Song" was written by Bill Oakley and Josh Weinstein, and directed by Bob Anderson. Oakley and Weinstein decided to do a Skinner and Bart episode because the staff wanted to take a diversion from the relatively wacky, fast-paced episodes that had comprised Season 5 so far and, according to show runner David Mirkin, "slow down parts of the show to take time for more emotional episodes like this one". Much of Principal Skinner's behavior in the episode is based on teachers Oakley and Weinstein had in high school who, according to Oakley, were "sad, lonely guys who lived with their mothers". It was selected to air as the 100th episode of the show because the staff wanted that particular episode to focus on Bart.

Baby Gerald, Luigi Risotto, Assistant Superintendent Leopold, and Flanders' parents make their first appearances on the show in this episode. Leopold and Luigi were designed by David Silverman, one of the show's directors. Anderson thought Luigi was one of the funniest characters on the show when he first read Luigi's lines in the script during a table read of the episode. When Anderson skimmed through the script and saw Luigi's lines, he said he "frightened Julie Kavner because I was laughing to myself, but trying to keep the laughter in because it was so damn funny."

"Sweet Seymour Skinner's Baadasssss Song" originally aired on the Fox network in the United States on April 28, 1994. The episode was selected for release in a 1999 video collection of selected episodes called, The Simpsons: Greatest Hits, which also included the episodes "Simpsons Roasting on an Open Fire", "Lisa's First Word", "Trash of the Titans", and "Bart Gets an 'F'. The episode was again included in the 2003 DVD release of the Greatest Hits set, which also included all the other episodes except "Trash of the Titans". "Sweet Seymour Skinner's Baadasssss Song" was also included in The Simpsons season five DVD set, which was released on December 21, 2004.

Cultural references

 The episode's title is a reference to the 1971 Melvin Van Peebles film Sweet Sweetback's Baadasssss Song.
 Skinner's quote "We'll always have the laundromat" is a reference to a famous quote by Humphrey Bogart in Casablanca.
 The beginning scene of the episode, in which Marge, Lisa, and Bart watch a home video, is a parody of the television series The Wonder Years; the Joe Cocker version of the song "With a Little Help from My Friends" from that series is also used in the background of the opening scene.
 The scene in which Santa's Little Helper runs through the school vent is a reference to a scene in the film Alien, as is Skinner's use of a heat-seeking tracer to pin down the positions of Groundskeeper Willie and Santa's Little Helper within the ventilation system.
 Skinner says he was shot in the back at a United Service Organizations (USO) show while trying to get "Joey Heatherton to put some pants on", a reference to American actress Joey Heatherton.
 Skinner's attire and shots of him running with his troops are references to the 1987 film Full Metal Jacket.
 Skinner tells Apu Nahasapeemapetilon of his plan to write a novel about an amusement park with dinosaurs called Billy and the Cloneasaurus, which Apu rightfully (and angrily, at great length) condemns as plagiarism; the book is a reference to the Michael Crichton novel Jurassic Park.
 When Martin is in a cage, he is singing the Toreador Song from the opera Carmen.
 In describing the relationship of Bart and Skinner, Lisa compares them to Sherlock Holmes and Professor Moriarty, the famous characters from the Sir Arthur Conan Doyle detective stories; she also compares them to Mountain Dew and Mello Yello, which she describes as mortal enemies, concluding that Bart needs Skinner as an adversary in order to be truly happy.

Reception

Critical reception
Since airing, the episode has received a positive critical reception from television critics.

The authors of the book I Can't Believe It's a Bigger and Better Updated Unofficial Simpsons Guide, Warren Martyn and Adrian Wood, wrote, "The 100th episode [...] is a fine one, with Principal Skinner's idea for a novel and the conduct of the staff at the Italian restaurant as highpoints."

DVD Movie Guides Colin Jacobson said the opening scene of episode reminded him of when he was in second grade and got a puppy for Christmas. Jacobson said, "I still recall the excitement when my mom brought [the dog] into school for the others to see, and the first segment of [the episode] reflects the atmosphere caused by a doggie visit. The rest of the episode gets into Skinner’s life nicely. Toss in a great Alien reference and the episode offers yet another solid show." Jacobson also said he liked the appearance of Flanders's "beatnik father".

Gary Mullinax of The News Journal called the episode "very funny" and named it one of his top-ten favorite episodes. Patrick Bromley of DVD Verdict gave the episode a B+ grade, and Bill Gibron of DVD Talk gave the episode a 4 out of 5 score.

Dave Manley of DVDActive said in a review of The Simpsons: Greatest Hits that it was "certainly one of the weaker [episodes on the DVD] – I can only assume the fact that it was episode 100 is what gets it onto this disc."

Ratings
In its original American broadcast, "Sweet Seymour Skinner's Baadasssss Song" finished 16th in the ratings for the week of April 25–May 1, 1994, with a Nielsen Rating of 12.7, translating to 12 million households. The episode was the highest-rated show on the Fox network that week.

References

External links

The Simpsons (season 5) episodes
1994 American television episodes
Television episodes about termination of employment
Television episodes about educators

it:Episodi de I Simpson (quinta stagione)#Il direttore in grigioverde